Hell of a Night or A Hell of a Night may refer to:

A Hell of a Night, a live album by Dave Evans (singer)
Hell of a Night, an EP by The Team
"Hell of a Night" (Dustin Lynch song), 2014
"Hell of a Night" (Schoolboy Q song), 2014
"Hell of a Night", a song by Dorrough from the album Get Big (2010)
"Hell of a Night", a song by Travis Scott from album Owl Pharaoh (2013)
"A Hell of a Night", a song by Roy Gaines and the Crusaders, from album Gainelining (1981)

See also
"Helluva Nite", a song by Madcon from Contraband (2010)